Jay M. Harris is an American scholar and Harry Austryn Wolfson Professor of Jewish Studies at Harvard University. He is known for his works on Jewish history.

Biography 
Harris received his bachelor's, master's, and doctoral degrees from Columbia University. He also obtained a master's degree from the Jewish Theological Seminary of America.

Harris taught at Columbia, the Jewish Theological Seminary, Princeton University, and the University of Pennsylvania, before joining the Harvard faculty in 1989. He was named Harris K. Weston Associate Professor of the Humanities in 1991 and the Harry Austryn Wolfson Professor of Jewish Studies in 1994.

Harris served as co-master of Cabot House. From 2000 to 2004, Harris was also editor of the AJS Review.

In 2008, Harris was named dean of undergraduate education at Harvard College before stepping down in 2017.

References

Living people
Harvard University faculty
Date of birth missing (living people)
Jewish scholars
Year of birth missing (living people)

Columbia College (New York) alumni
Columbia Graduate School of Arts and Sciences alumni
Jewish Theological Seminary of America alumni
Princeton University faculty
Columbia University faculty
University of Pennsylvania faculty
American university and college faculty deans